This is the list of squares located in Estonia. The list is incomplete.

References 

 
Squares